Black Mesa is a mesa in the U.S. states of Colorado, New Mexico, and Oklahoma. It extends from Mesa de Maya, Colorado southeasterly  along the north bank of the Cimarron River, crossing the northeast corner of New Mexico to end at the confluence of the Cimarron River and North Carrizo Creek near Kenton in the Oklahoma panhandle. In northwestern Cimarron County, Oklahoma, Black Mesa reaches , the highest point in the state of Oklahoma. The plateau that formed at the top of the mesa has been known as a "geological wonder" of North America. There is abundant wildlife in this shortgrass prairie environment, including mountain lions, butterflies, and the Texas horned lizard.

History
The plateau has been home to Plains Indians.

In the late-nineteenth and early twentieth century the area was a hideout for outlaws such as William Coe and Black Jack Ketchum. The outlaws built a fort known as the Robbers' Roost. The stone fort housed a blacksmith shop, gun ports, and a piano. The present-day Oklahoma Panhandle area, which was then considered a no man's land, lacked law enforcement agencies and hence the outlaws found it safe to hide in the region. However, as new settlers arrived in the area for copper and coal mining and also for cattle ranching activities by grazing cattle in the mesa region, law enforcement became more effective, and the outlaws were brought under control. In more recent times, at least one person has claimed to have been abducted by extraterrestrial aliens at Black Mesa.

Geography
The Mesa is situated in Cimarron County in the Oklahoma Panhandle. The Black Mesa plateau is part of the Rocky Mountains and the shortgrass prairie. Some features include the Old Maid Rock, 
and Devil's Tombstone. The mesa's base includes a  escarpment which is parallel with the Dry Cimarron River's north bank. In northwestern Cimarron County, Oklahoma, Black Mesa reaches , the highest point in the state of Oklahoma.

The mesa's highest point within Oklahoma is marked by a granite obelisk, and a visitors' log.

Climate
Black Mesa is not only the highest point in Oklahoma but it is also the driest, harshest and coldest place in the state.  A nearby weather station is located in Kenton.

Geology
The visual and map view appearance of Black Mesa is as an "inverted valley" because erosion has removed the relatively soft sedimentary strata from either side of the resistant Raton basalt of the lava which originally had occupied and filled a river valley. The mesa is capped by erosion-resistant basaltic lava formed by a volcanic eruption 3 to 5 million years ago. The lava erupted from a vent in the Raton-Clayton volcanic field in northeastern New Mexico and southeastern Colorado. The erupting lava filled a stream channel in the Pliocene age Ogallala Formation. During the years since the eruption, the adjacent rock of the Ogallala and older formations have been removed leaving the valley-filling basalt perched atop a long ridge. Strata exposed along the mesa below the basalt and Ogallala include the Cretaceous Dakota Sandstone and the Jurassic Morrison Formation.

Beginning in 1935, geologists and paleontologists have searched the mesa's outcroppings, finding dinosaur fossils in the Jurassic and Triassic strata. A large quantity of dinosaur bones has been recovered from the Black Mesa locale; totaling over eighteen tonnes. These remains were split between several species, including stegosaurus, camptosaurus, diplodocus, and edmontosaurus. Clear fossil physical evidence, a distinct line of footprints believed to have been made by an allosaurus, has been found juxtaposed with the Carrizo Creek, which runs around the modern-day northern edge of the mesa.

Protected area

The mesa lies in the protected area known as the Black Mesa Nature Preserve which was established in 1991, covering . The preserve protects 60% of the area of the mesa peak. The peak is accessible along an  trail.

Apart from the nature reserve, there is also the Black Mesa State Park encompassing , with a  lake known as Lake Carl Etling. The park is a recreational area with many facilities for camping, hiking and many other outdoor activities. The park is about 15 miles away from the peak.

Wildlife
The flora and fauna and terrain of Black Mesa are unique in Oklahoma, more typical of the semi-arid grasslands and rocky buttes of eastern Colorado and New Mexico. Many species reach their easternmost or westernmost limits of their ranges here.

Black Mesa Nature Preserve in particular covers around 60% of the flat portion of the mesa in Oklahoma. Wildlife reported in the park and the reserve are golden eagles, piñon jays, red-tailed hawks, and mule deer, part from a bird area for bird watchers.

Flora
The vegetation of the preserve is mostly shortgrass prairie with scattered juniper trees and Cholla cactus. The summit plateau is vegetatively classified as a "Bluestem-grama shortgrass community". The preserve contains 23 plant species listed by the state as "rare"

Fauna

The indigenous top predator is the mountain lion; its cousin, the smaller bobcat, is also present. The more omnivorous American black bear is present, along with a variety of prey species including bighorn sheep, mule deer, and pronghorn. Eight native species of animal are state-level designated as "rare". Two lagomorphs are present, the eastern cottontail (Sylvilagus floridanus), and the black-tailed jackrabbit (Lepus californicus). Other mammals include the dog-like coyote, as well as the much smaller prairie dog and a species of badger.

Nine snake species are found in this arid environment, the plains hog-nosed snake, western coachwhip, bullsnake, longnose snake, plains blackhead snake, blackneck garter snake, plains garter snake, lined snake, and prairie rattlesnake. The broad-headed skink, prairie racerunner, red-lipped plateau lizard, northern earless lizard, eastern collared lizard, and Texas horned lizard are also indigenous to the area. Two types of turtle, the ornate box turtle and the yellow mud turtle have been found in the Black Mesa preserve. Only one frog is found in this desert habitat, the American bullfrog, but there are six other species of amphibians; the Great Plains narrowmouth toad, New Mexico spadefoot, plains spadefoot, Woodhouse's toad, red-spotted toad, and the western green toad, all toads.

Birds are common, and there are 59 species present during at least some years. Seven different raptors are found, the turkey vulture, American kestrel, golden eagle, ferruginous hawk, red-tailed hawk, Mississippi kite, and the prairie falcon, all of which are classed as being of least concern according to the IUCN. There is one other bird of prey, the western screech-owl. There are no waterfowl found on Black Mesa. The mourning dove, greater roadrunner, common nighthawk, common poorwill, ladder-backed woodpecker, red-shafted flicker, olive-sided flycatcher, Say's phoebe, ash-throated flycatcher, Cassin's kingbird, and western kingbird are also found. There are five corvids; the black-billed magpie, pinyon jay, American crow, and common raven, as well as the more local Chihuahuan raven.

61 species of butterfly are found in the preserve, including seventeen skippers, three swallowtails, four hairstreaks, a copper, four whites, nine true brushfoots, two satyrs, and a leafwing.

There are 91 species of moths on Black Mesa. No species of fish are found on Black Mesa.

Culture
A permanent exhibit in the Sam Noble Museum is a diorama of the Black Mesa. Funds for its creation were provided by the Whitten-Newman Foundation. The diorama is touchscreen computerized and interactive and is set within the boundaries of the mesa. It is a replication of the real shape and form of the mesa and is modeled to a suitable scale which brings out the short-grass prairie habitat next to a rivulet. Stuffed and mounted animals on display are the ones found in the mesa, including eagle, vulture, mule deer, pronghorn antelope, mountain lion, prairie dog, jackrabbit and badger. An ephemeral lake is also on display in a cross section format. Star gazers gather each October near Black Mesa for the annual Okie-Tex Star Party.

References

External links

 Black Mesa State Park & Nature Preserve
 TopoQuest map of Black Mesa State Park
 Black Mesa trip report

Landforms of Cimarron County, Oklahoma
Landforms of Las Animas County, Colorado
Mesas of Oklahoma
Landforms of Union County, New Mexico
Mesas of New Mexico
Highest points of U.S. states
Mesas of Colorado
North American 1000 m summits
Articles containing video clips
Geography of Oklahoma